Chandlers Hill is a suburb of Adelaide, South Australia. It lies within the City of Onkaparinga and has postcode 5159.

History

References

Suburbs of Adelaide